Palaeoctonus is an extinct genus of archosaur (possibly phytosaur) known only from isolated teeth. The name is derived from Greek  (palaios meaning "ancient", -ktonos meaning "killer"). The genus is believed to have flourished during the Upper (Late) Triassic period.

External links 
 list of dinosaur names
 supplementary information
 Palaeoctonus

Phytosaurs
Late Triassic reptiles of North America
Prehistoric reptile genera